Quality Reliability Technology, QRT Inc. is a leading-edge solution and system provider in reliability testing and failure analysis for microelectronics devices and systems.
 Q code, an amateur radio code referring to shutting down a station
 Quantitative PCR or qrt-PCR, a laboratory technique for amplifying targeted DNA molecules
 Drug abuse response team, also known as a Quick Response Team, in the U.S.
 The Quarto Group (LSE: QRT), a global illustrated book publishing group
 News TV Quick Response Team, an early evening news program in the Philippines

See also

 
 Quick response team (disambiguation)